Gully is an album by Indian band Euphoria. The album was released by T-Series in January 2003.

Track Listing
 Raja Rani.
 Ab Na Jaa
 Aana Meri Gully
 Meethi Chaashni
 
 What Is The Mantra Of Your Life?
 Mantra
Kya Yeh Sach Hai?
Kuchh Nahin
Oo Piyu
Aisa Ek Jahaan
Waise Hi
 
Lori 1: Sone De Maa
 Lori 2: Ab Naa Jeena
 Praarthnaa

External links
Gully website

2003 albums
Euphoria (Indian band) albums